Glenelg Country School is a nonsectarian, co-educational independent day school in Howard County, Maryland, adjacent to Columbia, Maryland and between Baltimore and Washington, D.C. The School offers a continuous college-preparatory program from age 2 through grade 12. GCS was founded in 1954, enrolling 35 students in grades one through seven. In the fall of 1985, the new Upper School division opened with 10 students. The first class graduated in June 1989. Today, Glenelg Country School enrolls over 750 students.

History
The Glenelg Manor was built on a part of land patented as "Dorsey's Grove" in 1721. It also included land patented by John Dorsey named "Dorseys Luck" renamed to "Howard's Resolution". Glenelg Manor houses the Glenelg Country School elementary division. The original structure of the house dates from circa 1740 to the second half of the 18th century, and may have been built by Ephraim Howard.

General Joseph Tyson built the Tudor expansion in the 1800s The estate passed to Tyson's son Henry H. Tyson, followed by the Knox family in 1900. William Bladen Lowndes, son of Maryland governor Lloyd Lowndes, Jr., purchased the estate in 1915 and added amenities such as outdoor projectors, golf course, and diesel generators. After Lowndes died in 1941, the property was sold to Rowland D. and George R. Zaiser of Wilton Farm Dairy for farming. In 1956 the estate was subdivided into a smaller parcel to be leased out as a school.

It was listed on the National Register of Historic Places in 1983.

Glenelg Country School
The original building was rented in 1954 when the Glenelg Country School was founded by Kingdon Gould, Jr. and his wife Mary Thorne Gould, along with Mr. and Mrs. John T. Mason, Jr., Judge James Macgill and Mr. and Mrs. William Shippen. Marjorie Dunn was the first Headmistress for Glenelg Country School, serving 1954–1956. Subsequent Headmasters/Headmistresses: Beatrice Pfefferkorn (1956–1959); Edward L. Jones (1959–1964); Peter T. Terry (1964–1966); Thomas J. Barlow (interim head in 1966 for Peter Terry); Frederic W. Rhinelander (1966–1977); Charles H. Miller, Jr. (1977–1990); Ryland O. Chapman III (1990–2007); Gregory J. Ventre (2007–2021); and Matthew J. Walsh (2021–present).

In 2014, County Executive Ken Ulman proposed CR-121-2014 in his last weeks of pre-election activities. The bill would finance eight million dollars of an expansion and revitalization of the athletic facilities, a two–story press box, grandstands and restoration of existing tennis courts and athletic center floors. It included the renovation and restoration of buildings and the Historic Manor House.

Overview

 750 students age 2 through grade 12
 111 faculty members, 11 assistant teachers; 65% of faculty hold advanced degrees
 Student/Faculty Ratio: 6:1
 Average Class Size: 15
 18 Advanced Placement courses offered
 College Placement: 2 full-time college counselors; Class of 2015 SAT average score of 1846; 100% of seniors are accepted to four-year colleges or universities; the class of 2015 was awarded over $5.8 million in merit scholarships

Notable alumni

Isaiah Miles (born 1994), basketball player in the Israeli Basketball Premier League

Athletics  

2006 - Varsity Girls Tennis won the IAAM B Conference Championship
2006 - Ice Hockey won the MIAA C Conference Championship
2007 - Varsity Boys Basketball won the MIAA C Conference Championship
2007 - Women's Cross Country won the Private School's State Championship
2008 - Varsity Tennis won the MIAA B Conference Championship; the team also brought home two individual titles
2008 - Ice Hockey won the MIAA B Conference Championship
2010 - Varsity Golf won the MIAA B Conference Championship
2010 - Varsity Boys Lacrosse makes MIAA B Conference Championship for first time in program history 
2011 - Varsity Women's Field Hockey won the IAAM B Conference Championship
2011 - Varsity Women's Cross Country won the IAAM C Conference Championship
2011 - Varsity Boys Basketball won the MIAA B Conference Championship
2011 - Varsity Boys Basketball Team moved up to the MIAA A Conference
2013 - Varsity Boys Baseball won the MIAA B Conference Championship
2013 - Varsity Boys Cross Country won the MIAA B Conference Championship
2014 - Varsity Girls Soccer won the IAAM C Conference Championship (undefeated season)
2015 - Varsity Girls Lacrosse won the IAAM B Conference Championship
2015 - Varsity Girls Soccer won the IAAM C Conference Championship 
2016 - Varsity Girls Lacrosse won the IAAM B Conference Championship
2016 - Varsity Girls Lacrosse team moved up to the IAAM A Conference
2017 - Varsity Girls Indoor Track and Field won the IAAM B Conference Championship
2017 - Varsity Girls Outdoor Track and Field won the IAAM B Conference Championship

The Arts

Music and art classes begin at age 2 and continue through twelfth grade. Music classes include: chorus; recorder ensembles; bell choirs; bands; a jazz ensemble; a woodwind trio; a string quartet; Lower, Upper School plays; Middle and Upper School musicals, with 50% of Upper School students participating in the performing arts. There are music rooms in each division and a 350-seat Mulitz Theater with a scenery shop and dressing rooms.

Art classes include: painting, drawing, film and digital photography, ceramics, wood-working, metals, and other specialized classes. Each division has a studio space. The Upper School has separate 2-D and 3-D facilities and a black/white photography lab.

Gallery

See also
List of Howard County properties in the Maryland Historical Trust

References

External links

School official site
Profile in Private Schools Review
, including photo from 2001, at Maryland Historical Trust

Preparatory schools in Maryland
Educational institutions established in 1954
Private high schools in Maryland
School buildings on the National Register of Historic Places in Maryland
Gothic Revival architecture in Maryland
Houses completed in 1845
Schools in Howard County, Maryland
Private middle schools in Maryland
Private elementary schools in Maryland
1954 establishments in Maryland
National Register of Historic Places in Howard County, Maryland